Old Sussex County Courthouse is a historic courthouse located at Georgetown, Sussex County, Delaware.  It was built in 1793, and is a two-story, five bay, frame structure in a late Georgian style.  It is sheathed in cypress shingles.  It was moved to its present location in 1837 and converted to residential use.  Its former site on The Circle is occupied by the present Sussex County Courthouse.  On September 20, 1962, the building and lot were conveyed to the State of Delaware. A major renovation project was undertaken in 1974.

The site was added to the National Register of Historic Places in 1971.

References

External links

County courthouses in Delaware
Courthouses on the National Register of Historic Places in Delaware
Georgian architecture in Delaware
Government buildings completed in 1793
Buildings and structures in Georgetown, Delaware
National Register of Historic Places in Sussex County, Delaware
1793 establishments in Delaware